Crosskart or off-road kart is a type of kart racing that takes place on autocross, rallycross, dirt oval or ice racing tracks instead of on paved tracks.

Competitions take place in classes that are based on cylinder volume (125 cc, 250 cc, or 650 cc). The 125 cc class is a junior class, open to those 12 years of age and older, but one can begin training at age 10. The 250 cc, and 650 cc classes are open to people above 16 years of age.

Erland Andersson of Sweden is said to have invented the crosskart in the early 1980s. The idea was to create something that is safe, cheap, and easy to maintain, but still fun to ride. The crosskart is basically a simplified version of a sprint car, midget car and mini sprint.

Crosskarting is probably most popular in the Nordic countries, although in southern Europe a similar motorsport with more powerful engines, kartcross, exists.

See also
 Buggy
 Off road go-kart

References

External links

Svenska Bilsportsförbundet - Crosskart
FIA-Federation Internationale Automobile
Swedish Crosskart drivers Association
Swedish Crosskart drivers Association
Norway Crosskart drivers Association
Danish Crosskart drivers Association
Latvian Crosskart drivers Association

Auto racing by type
Kart models
Kart racing series
Off-road vehicles